Stennett is a surname. Notable people with the name include:

Adam Stennett (born 1972), American painter
Clint Stennett (1956–2010), American politician
Joseph Stennett (1663–1713), English Seventh Day Baptist minister and hymnwriter (grandfather of Samuel Stennett)
Michelle Stennett (born 1960), American politician
Rennie Stennett (born 1951), Panamanian baseball player
Samuel Stennett (1727–1795), English Seventh Day Baptist minister and hymnwriter (grandson of Joseph Stennett)
Stan Stennett (born 1925), Welsh comedian, actor and jazz musician

See also